NGC 2509 is an open cluster in the constellation of Puppis. It was discovered on 3 December 1783 by William Herschel. It was described as "bright, pretty rich, slightly compressed" by John Louis Emil Dreyer, the compiler of the New General Catalogue.

The cluster is about 14 light-years (4.2 parsecs) wide, but the cluster's other parameters remain poorly known. Some studies have estimated a distance of about 9,500 light-years (2,900 parsecs) away from the Solar System, while older estimates put it at only 2980 light-years (912 parsecs) away. Estimates of the cluster's age have also varied significantly, from 1.2 billion years old to 8 billion years old. The latest analysis based on the parallaxes measured by the Gaia spacecraft confirms that it is a relatively distant object, with a distance between 2500 and 3000 parsecs.

References

Open clusters
Puppis
2509